Edwin "Ted" J. R. Wilkins (third ¼ 1936) is an English former professional rugby league footballer who played in the 1950s.

Background
Ted Wilkins' birth was registered in Wakefield district, West Riding of Yorkshire.

Playing career

Notable tour matches
Ted Wilkins played  in Wakefield Trinity's 17-12 victory over Australia in the 1956–57 Kangaroo tour of Great Britain and France match at Belle Vue, Wakefield on Monday 10 December 1956.

Club career
Ted Wilkins  made his début for Wakefield Trinity during April 1955, he appears to have scored no drop-goals (or field-goals as they are currently known in Australasia), but prior to the 1974–75 season all goals, whether; conversions, penalties, or drop-goals, scored 2-points, consequently prior to this date drop-goals were often not explicitly documented, therefore '0' drop-goals may indicate drop-goals not recorded, rather than no drop-goals scored.

References

External links
Search for "Wilkins" at rugbyleagueproject.org

1936 births
Living people
Rugby league players from Wakefield
Rugby league fullbacks
Wakefield Trinity players